The Fantome class is a class of eight small survey motor boats (SMBs) operated by the Royal Australian Navy (RAN) and DMS Maritime. They are fitted with navigational and survey equipment and are unarmed.

Design and construction
They are fitted with two Volvo Penta AQAD 41D/SP290 diesels, connected to two outdrives, which allow the vessels to reach . They are fitted with a JRC JMA-2141 navigation radar and SMBs on the Hydrographic Ships have Atlas Deso 30 single beam echo sounders, MBES Fansweep 20 multibeam echosounders and CMAX TLW Side Scan Sonar. They are also fitted with Fugro Seastar 3100 WAdGPS for horizontal positioning and POSMV as the position monitoring system. Four personnel crew each vessel; one officer/senior sailor and three sailors. The Fantome SMBs are unarmed.

All eight vessels were constructed by Pro Marine at Seaford, Victoria. They entered service between October 1992 and July 1993.

The Fantome design was used as the basis for the Antarctic survey launch .

Operations

Six of the RAN's Fantome-class boats are carried on board its two s. Each of these ships can carry three survey motor boats. DMS Maritime maintains all eight boats.

Vessels
The nine boats are:
SMB 1005 Investigator     [Taken out of service 2001]
SMB 1006 Fantome
SMB 1007 Meda
SMB 1008 Duyfken
SMB 1009 Tom Thumb
SMB 1010 John Gowland
SMB 1011 Geographe
SMB 1012 Casuarina
SMB 1021 Condor

Citations

References

External links

Survey ships of the Royal Australian Navy
Training ships of the Royal Australian Navy